Maestro Zone is the third studio album by Canadian rapper Maestro Fresh Wes, released April 21, 1992 on Polydor/PolyGram Records. It is a re-packaged version of his previous album, The Black Tie Affair, featuring four new songs. The only single was "Another Funky Break (From My Pap's Crate)". In 1992, just before the album was released, Maestro moved to Brooklyn, New York in an attempt to expand his fanbase in the US. It was nominated for Best Rap Recording at the 1993 Juno Awards.

Track listing

References

1992 albums
Albums produced by K-Cut (producer)
Maestro Fresh-Wes albums
Polydor Records albums
PolyGram albums